SCH-50911 is a selective GABAB antagonist. Its main applications are in pharmacology research.

SCH-50911 also acts as an anticonvulsant under normal conditions. SCH-50911 induces acute withdrawal syndrome in GHB-dependent rats, similar to the delirium tremens seen in human alcohol withdrawal, and can precipitate convulsions in GHB-dependent animals.

References

Antidotes
Carboxylic acids
GABAB receptor antagonists
Morpholines